Charalambos Sfakianakis (born 23 May 1963) is a Greek weightlifter. He competed in the men's light heavyweight event at the 1988 Summer Olympics.

References

External links
 

1963 births
Living people
Greek male weightlifters
Olympic weightlifters of Greece
Weightlifters at the 1988 Summer Olympics
Place of birth missing (living people)